Cry Uncle!, released in the UK as Super Dick (theatrical title) and American Oddballs (video title), is a 1971 American film in the Troma Entertainment library. It is directed by John G. Avildsen and stars Allen Garfield. The story, based on the Michael Brett novel Lie a Little, Die a Little, follows the misadventures of a slobbish private detective who is hired by a millionaire to investigate a murder. The film features one of Paul Sorvino's first screen performances, and an early appearance from TV star Debbi Morgan.

Plot
Private detective Jake Masters is with his girlfriend Renee when he gets a call about a new case. The New York City Police Department is hunting for an eccentric millionaire, Jason Dominic, in connection with the murder of a cocktail waitress named Lucille Reynolds. Jason wants Jake to find the real killer. Jake goes to LaGuardia Airport to pick up Jason's bodyguard, Cora Merrill. After an initial case of mistaken identity, Jake, his trainee nephew Keith, and Cora meet up and visit Jason's yacht. Jason tells them the police believe he killed Lucille because she had filmed an orgy featuring him with three prostitutes, who then blackmailed him out of $50,000.

Jake, Keith, and Cora go back to Jake's apartment. Cora rebuffs Jake's advances and instead has sex with Keith. The three start working through their list of prostitutes and other unsavory suspects one by one. While questioning a man, Cora becomes violent, leading Jake to exclude her from questioning others afterward. During one encounter, two prostitutes and a male suspect tie up Jake, but the male suspect goes outside and is killed by an unknown person. Jake then follows one of the prostitutes to an apartment and rapes her before realizing that she is dead.

By chance, Jake finds out that Cora's story does not make sense. He realizes that she is actually working on the orders of Jason to kill the blackmailers after Jake has located them. Jake notifies the police of this. He then goes back to his apartment and has sex with Cora. Afterward, he confronts her, and she admits to killing all of the suspects. A struggle ensues, and Cora is killed by the police. Renee then surprises Jake at his apartment, and the two are happy to be reunited.

Cast
Allen Garfield – Jake Masters
Madeleine Le Roux – Cora Merrill
Devin Goldenberg – Keith
David Kirk – Jason Dominic
Pamela Gruen – Renee
Sean Walsh – Gene Sprigg
Debbi Morgan – Olga Winter
Maureen Byrnes – Lena Right
Nancy Salmon – Connie Landfield
Bruce Pecheur – Larry Caulk
Paul Sorvino – Coughing Cop
Ray Barron – Bald Cop
Mel Stewart – Lt. Fowler
Jackson Beck – Narrator

Lloyd Kaufman, co-founder of Troma, has a cameo appearance as a hippie.

Reception
The film features a great deal of nudity, sex, drug use. The film was banned in Finland for the year following its release, and in Norway until 2003. In addition to becoming a cult classic, the film launched a string of Troma films that appeared in the 1970s, 1980s, and 1990s, many of them becoming cult films that ran on cable TV.

During an interview featured in the Special Edition of the film's DVD, Allen Garfield says that Cry Uncle! is Oliver Stone's favorite comedy.

See also
List of American films of 1971
List of Troma films

References

External links

Cry Uncle – at the Troma Entertainment movie database

1971 films
1970s sex comedy films
American sex comedy films
1970s English-language films
Troma Entertainment films
Films about murder
Films directed by John G. Avildsen
Films set in New York City
Necrophilia in film
1971 comedy films
Films with screenplays by David Odell
Films based on novels
American detective films
Fictional portrayals of the New York City Police Department
Films about the New York City Police Department
1970s American films